Ctenucha brunnea, the brown ctenucha or brown-winged ctenucha, is a moth of the family Erebidae. The species was first described by Richard Harper Stretch in 1872. It is found in the US from central to southern coastal California.

The length of the forewings is 18–20 mm. The forewings are pale brown with black veins and a blue spot at the wing base. The costa and fringe of the outer margin is white. Adults are on wing from mid May to mid July. They feed on the nectar of Heteromeles arbutifolia.

The larvae feed on Leymus condensatus.

References

Moths described in 1872
brunnea